McLeese, Mac Leese, or variant, may refer to:

People
 Dana Dane (born 1965), stagename of Dana McLeese, U.S. hiphop artist
 Robert McLeese (1828-1898), Canadian hotelier
 Roy W. McLeese III, Canadian judge

Places
 McLeese Lake, British Columbia, Canada, an unincorporated community
 McLeese Lake (originally Mud Lake), a lake in Cariboo, British Columbia, Canada

See also
 Leese (disambiguation)
 5641 McCleese, an asteroid